António Valverde Martins (1935 – 14 November 2020) was a Portuguese politician who served as a Deputy.

References

1935 births
2020 deaths
Portuguese politicians